Bertram Jones may refer to:

Earl Jones (investment advisor) (Bertram Earl Jones, born 1942), Canadian non-practicing investment adviser
Bert Jones (born 1951), American football quarterback

See also
Bert Jones (disambiguation)